Grimaldi is a 1914 British silent historical film directed by Charles E. Vernon and starring Bransby Williams and Sid Kearns. The film is based on Dion Boucicault's 1855 play Grimaldi about the nineteenth century actor Joseph Grimaldi.

Partial cast
 Bransby Williams as Joseph Grimaldi  
 Sid Kearns

References

Bibliography
 Goble, Alan. The Complete Index to Literary Sources in Film. Walter de Gruyter, 1999.

External links

1914 films
1910s historical films
British historical films
British biographical films
British silent short films
British films based on plays
Films set in London
Films set in the 19th century
Biographical films about actors
British black-and-white films
1910s English-language films
1910s British films